Palline notera is a species of small air-breathing land snails, terrestrial pulmonate gastropod mollusks in the family Charopidae. This species is endemic to Palau.

References

N
Endemic fauna of Palau
Molluscs of Oceania
Molluscs of the Pacific Ocean
Taxonomy articles created by Polbot